Daniele Santarelli (born June 8, 1981 in Foligno) is an Italian women's volleyball coach. He is the current head coach of Imoco Volley and the Turkey women's national volleyball team. Previously, he was coach of the Croatian national team, and the Serbian national team with whom he won the 2022 World Championship.

Playing career
Santarelli played as libero in various lower categories of Italian league (Serie B) in Foligno, Vicenza, Legnago and Terracina before pursuing his career as a youth coach at a young age.

Coaching career
He was a coach for Italian teams such as Snoopy Pesaro, Robursport Pesaro, Robur Tiboni Urbino Volley. He currently leads Imoco Volley. With Imoco, Santarelli has won the Italian national league four times (2015, 2018, 2019, and 2021), 3 Italian Cups (2017, 2020 and 2021), 4 Italian Super Cups (2016, 2018, 2019 and 2020), 1 Club World Championship (2019) and the last edition of the CEV Champions League.

In the summer of 2018 he took the position of head coach of the Croatia women's national volleyball team, a position he held until the end of the 2021 European Championship. During that time he won two silver medals in the European league, held in Varaždin and Ruse. In January 2022 he became the head coach of Serbian women's national team and won bronze medal at FIVB Women's Nations League same year.

In October 2022, Serbian national women's team headed by Santarelli had won the world title at the 2022 FIVB Volleyball Women's World Championship held in Poland and the Netherlands. The team has defended the 2018 title won under the guidance of the previous coach Zoran Terzić. On December 27, 2022, it was announced by TVF that Daniele will be the new head coach of Turkey women's national volleyball team and the details of the agreement will be announced next week at a press conference to be held jointly by TVF President Mehmet Akif Üstündağ and Daniele himself.

Clubs 
FIVB Club World Championship:
  2019, 2022
  2021
CEV Champions League:
  2021
  2019, 2022
  2018
Italian Championship:
  2018, 2019, 2021, 2022
Italian SuperCup:
  2018, 2019, 2020, 2021
Italian Cup:
  2020, 2021, 2022

National Team 
FIVB World Championship:
  2022
FIVB Nations League:
  2022
European League:
  2019, 2021

Personal life 
Santarelli has a degree in physical education. He has been married to the volleyball player Monica De Gennaro since 2017.

References

External links

 LegaVolleyFemminile profile
 Volleybox profile
 CEV profile
 Old CEV profile

1981 births
Living people
Italian volleyball coaches
Turkey women's national volleyball team coaches